Héctor Luis Patri (born 12 December 1956) is an Argentine former professional boxer who competed from 1977 to 1994, challenging for the IBF light flyweight title in 1991. As an amateur, he represented his country in the light-flyweight division at the 1976 Summer Olympics, defeating Alodji Edoh and Mohamed Said Abdel Wehab before losing his third match against Orlando Maldonado.

References

External links
 
 

1956 births
Living people
Argentine male boxers
Olympic boxers of Argentina
Boxers at the 1976 Summer Olympics
Light-flyweight boxers
Mini-flyweight boxers
Sportspeople from La Plata